Rusovce is a borough in southern Bratislava on the right bank of the Danube river, close to the Austrian border.

History 
In the 1st century, there was a Roman settlement named Gerulata in today's Rusovce area. The first preserved written reference to the settlement is from 1208.

In 1910 Oroszvár had 1.802 inhabitants. Among them were 1.268 Germans, 439 Hungarians, 30 Slovaks, 20 Croats and 39 Others. It remained Hungarian after 1920 but became a border village close to Austria and Czechoslovakia. The German inhabitants were expulsed after 1945.

On October 15, 1947 - together with Čunovo and Jarovce - Rusovce became part of Czechoslovakia according to the Paris Peace Treaty. On January 1, 1972, it was made a borough of Bratislava.

Transport 
A motorway and road border crossings into Hungary are located in Rusovce. Across the border is Rajka in Győr-Moson-Sopron County. There are no more border checks at both crossings from December 21, 2007, with Hungary and Slovakia joining the Schengen Area.

Tourism 
Main sights include the ruins of the Roman military camp Gerulata, part of Limes Romanus, and Rusovce mansion built in the 19th century in the Neogothic style, located in the English park. Currently, it is closed to public.

Dunajské luhy Protected Landscape Area comprises some parts of the borough and is located east of the municipality.

Demographics
According to the 2011 census, the municipality had 2,845 inhabitants. 2,380 of inhabitants were Slovaks, 284 Hungarians and 181 others and unspecified.

Gallery

References 

Boroughs of Bratislava
Hungary–Slovakia border crossings
Croatian communities in Slovakia